SS Minnewaska was a British ocean liner that was one of the ships that assisted  with sending out survivors names following the 1912  disaster.

Construction 
Minnewaska was constructed in 1908 at the Harland & Wolff shipyard in Belfast, United Kingdom. She was launched on 12 November 1908 and completed in 1909. 
She had 2 quadruple expansion engines driving a two screw propellers and the engine was rated at 1,222 nhp.

She had five sister ships:

Accidents 

In her career as an ocean liner and transport ship, Minnewaska had a few accidents.

In late April 1911, 19-year-old seaman J. W. Browning fell overboard when his lifeline broke while he was working on the lifeboats. According to the New York Times he fell 18 meters from the speeding liner and had to swim desperately in his sea boots to avoid being drawn into her screws. Within a few seconds after the alarm Minnewaska had cut a wide circle to port and was heading back over her course. A boat under the command of Chief Officer James Grant Hutchison was soon lowered and Browning was brought back on board, thirteen minutes after his fall, but without his sea boots.

In October 1914, while Minnewaska was taking on cargo in New York when a fire developed in hold number two, where a consignment of sugar had been loaded. The blaze was extinguished only when the hold was flooded. The fire destroyed sugar worth $120,000 and there was some concern that it may have been deliberately set by German agents. But it seems to have been an accident and was blamed by Captain Thomas F. Gates on spontaneous combustion. Minnewaska was not materially damaged and sailed on schedule without any further incident.

On 28 April 1915, Minnewaska was present at the Gallipoli landings and was involved in a minor collision with SS Derfflinger off ANZAC Cove.

World War I 
Minnewaska had made 66 voyages from London to New York between May 1909 and January 1915. She was requisitioned by the British Government for service in World War I as a troopship. She sailed the Avonmouth - Alexandria route during this period in  her career. She was defensively armed with a gun mounted on her stern and made five voyages ferrying troops and artillery to the Dardanelles. She had some narrow escapes involving submarines.

Sinking 
On 29 November 1916, while she was travelling from Alexandria, Egypt to Saloniki with 1,600 troops.

The ship took on a rapidly increasing list and threatened to capsize  after the explosion but Captain Gates, who ordered everyone into their life belts and had lifeboats and rafts at the ready, managed to keep control of the ship and decided to steam at full speed to the nearby shore. He successfully ran her aground 46 meters west of Cape Deutero at the entrance to Suda Bay where she came to rest. It took about two hours to evacuate the ship and the men were rescued without loss by the trawler Danestone, the drifters Principal, Trustful and Deveronside, and the destroyer HMS Grampus. Due to his prompt action, there was no loss of life from the 1800 soldiers and 200 sailors on board at the time. He was subsequently awarded the Order of the British Empire for his actions.

Aftermath  
Minnewaska′s bottom had been torn away by the mine and she had to be abandoned on the beach where she lay for two years until in 1918, when she was sold to Italian shipbreakers for scrap. She was broken up on site and some parts of the wreck remain on the site to this day.

References

1908 ships
Ocean liners of the United Kingdom
Ships sunk by mines
Ships sunk with no fatalities
Ships built by Harland and Wolff
Maritime incidents in 1916
World War I shipwrecks in the Mediterranean Sea
Souda Bay
Ships built in the United Kingdom
Ships built in Belfast